The Cadet shipwreck is an archaeological site located in Lake George near Bolton in Warren County, New York. It is the site of the shipwreck of the 1893-built Olive ex Cadet steam launch. It was a 48-foot-long, 9.6-foot-wide wooden steamboat with a pointed bow, and was found submerged in approximately 50 feet of water. The ship was discovered by Bateaux Below Inc. in 1997. In 2005, the ship was reported to be in fairly good condition, with its hull mainly intact.

It was listed on the National Register of Historic Places in 2002.

References

Archaeological sites on the National Register of Historic Places in New York (state)
Shipwrecks of New York (state)
1893 ships
Buildings and structures in Warren County, New York
Shipwrecks in lakes
National Register of Historic Places in Warren County, New York